The Credit Union of Texas Event Center (formerly Allen Event Center) is an American 6,275 fixed-seat multi-purpose indoor arena located in Allen, Texas, a northern suburb of Dallas. The arena opened in 2009 under the name Allen Event Center. Construction cost was $52.6 million ($63.5 million in 2020 dollars). The City of Allen sold the naming rights to the arena to the Credit Union of Texas in 2021 for a seven-year term at $325,000 per year.

The center hosts the home games of the ECHL's Allen Americans and the relaunched Dallas Sidekicks of the Major Arena Soccer League. The Miss Texas pageant relocated to the center for 2012 and 2013. It was formerly the home of Champions Indoor Football's Texas Revolution (also previously called the Allen Wranglers) until the team moved to Frisco, Texas, in 2017.

In 2019, the event center hosted the NCWA National Wrestling Championship.

On April 27 and 29, 2019, the Dallas Fuel hosted the Overwatch League's first Homestand Weekend at the Allen Event Center. These matches were the first in league history to be played away from the Blizzard Arena in Burbank, California.

Premiere

The arena opened along with the entire "Village at Allen" power center on November 6, 2009. Reba McEntire played a concert that night to open the arena. Other events, including monster truck racing, appeared over the course of 2010.

References

Bibliography

External links
Credit Union of Texas Event Center website

Buildings and structures in Allen, Texas
Indoor ice hockey venues in the United States
Indoor soccer venues in the United States
Indoor arenas in Texas
Texas Revolution (indoor football)
Wrestling venues in the Dallas–Fort Worth metroplex
2009 establishments in Texas
Music venues in Texas
Dallas Fuel
Esports venues in Texas